The Stratford Warriors are a junior ice hockey team based in Stratford, Ontario, Canada.  They play in the Mid-Western division of the Greater Ontario Junior Hockey League. The team was originally named the Warriors but was changed to Cullitons in 1975 in honour of the team sponsor the Culliton brothers. The sponsorship from the Culliton brothers ended in 2016, bringing the name "Warriors" back to the city.

History

Between the years of 1951 and 1962, not much is known about junior hockey in the town of Stratford-St. Marys District. Prior to 1952, the Stratford Midgets, who became the Kroehlers and Kist Canadians won a Sutherland Cup in the 1940s and competed as Junior A team for the J. Ross Robertson Cup. Stratford played in the Central "B" from  1962 until 1969. When they joined the reformed Western "B" in 1969, they became the Warriors and stayed on board until 1975. In 1975, the team jumped to the precursor to the Mid-Western "B", the "Waterloo-Wellington Junior "B" Hockey League" and changed their name to the Cullitons, finishing first both seasons. They continued their dominance when the league was renamed the Mid-Western, winning eight of the first 13 championships they competed for. They have since won five more league championships. If the Stratford Canadians era is included, the Stratford Junior "B" club has captured eight Sutherland Cup titles, leading the Mid-Western "B" with six since its founding in 1977.  The Cullitons have never failed to make the playoffs since joining the Mid-Western "B", a feat matched only by the Waterloo Siskins. Between 1975-76 and 2004–05, the Cullitons never placed lower than third in the league standings.

One thing that sets the Cullitons apart from any other teams in the league, including the Siskins, is that until 2006 the Cullitons have only suffered one losing season. In fact, in their 32-year history the Cullitons have lost more than 10 games only eight times. On three occasions they registered more ties than losses. They have scored more than 300 goals in a season 11 times, and have only allowed more than 200 goals once. The Cullitons have also been regular-season champions 19 times.

Season-by-season record

1974-1975 
1975-1977 
1977-2002 
2002–Present

Sutherland Cup appearances
1977: Stratford Cullitons defeated Streetsville Derbys 4-games-to-2
1978: Stratford Cullitons defeated Streetsville Derbys 9-points-to-5
1981: Burlington Cougars defeated Stratford Cullitons 8-points-to-4
1983: Henry Carr Crusaders defeated Stratford Cullitons 4-games-to-none
1986: Stratford Cullitons defeated Streetsville Derbys 4-games-to-none
1990: Stratford Cullitons defeated St. Catharines Falcons 4-games-to-none
1995: Stratford Cullitons defeated St. Thomas Stars 4-games-to-none
1999: Chatham Maroons defeated Stratford Cullitons 4-games-to-3
2003: Stratford Cullitons defeated Thorold Blackhawks 4-games-to-3
2004: Stratford Cullitons defeated Thorold Blackhawks 4-games-to-none

Notable alumni

Mark Bell
Rob Blake
Boyd Devereaux
Greg de Vries
Nelson Emerson
Dave Farrish
Jeff Halpern
Rem Murray
Ed Olczyk
Mike Peluso
Chris Pronger
David Shaw
Bryan Smolinski
Garth Snow
Tim Taylor
Mike Watt 
Zac Dalpe
Steve Miller (NHL Linesmen)
Kendrick Nicholson (NHL Referee)
Tyson Baker (NHL Linesmen)

References

External links
Warriors Webpage
GOJHL Webpage

More sources
OHA Webpage Sutherland Cup History provided by OHA via Official 2006-07 Handbook
Official Game Puck Basic Team Name History

Ice hockey teams in Ontario
Sport in Stratford, Ontario